John Joseph "Joe" Hawcridge (28 September 1863 – 1 January 1905), also known by the nickname of the "Artful Dodger", was an English rugby union footballer who played in the 1880s. He played at representative level for England, and at club level for Bradford F.C., as a three-quarter, i.e. wing or centre. Prior to Tuesday 27 August 1895, Bradford F.C. was a rugby union club, it then became a rugby league club, and since 1907 it has been the association football (soccer) club Bradford Park Avenue.

Background
Joe Hawcridge was born in Macclesfield, Cheshire, and he died aged 41 in San Francisco, United States.

Playing career

International honours
Joe Hawcridge won caps for England while at Bradford F.C. in 1885 against Wales, and Ireland.

Change of Code
When Bradford F.C. converted from the rugby union code to the rugby league code on Tuesday 27 August 1895, Joe Hawcridge would have been approximately 31. Consequently, he could have been both a rugby union and rugby league footballer for Bradford F.C.

In the early years of rugby football the goal was to score goals, and a try had zero value, but it provided the opportunity to try at goal, and convert the try to a goal with an unopposed kick at the goal posts. The point values of both the try and goal have varied over time, and in the early years footballers could "score" a try, without scoring any points.

Genealogical information
Joe Hawcridge's marriage to Helena Jane (née Wilkinson) (born first ¼ 1868 in Bradford – died July–September 1937 (age 69) in  Wharfedale) was registered during first ¼ 1888 in Bradford district.

Note
Joe Hawcridge's surname is variously spelt correctly with a "c" as Hawcridge, or incorrectly with a "k" Hawkridge.

References

External links
Search for "Hawcridge" at rugbyleagueproject.org
Search for "Hawkridge" at rugbyleagueproject.org
Photograph "The "Artful Dodger" - The Robbie Paul of the 1880s - Date: 01/01/1885" at rlhp.co.uk

1863 births
1905 deaths
Bradford F.C. players
England international rugby union players
English rugby union players
Rugby union players from Macclesfield
Rugby union three-quarters